The 3rd Adelaide Film Festival took place in Adelaide, South Australia, from 22 February to 4 March 2007. Katrina Sedgwick was again Festival Director. Rolf de Heer received the 2007 Don Dunstan Award for his contribution to the Australian film industry.

The festival opened with Lucky Miles, directed by Michael James Rowland, and closed with Dr. Plonk, directed by Rolf de Heer. Both films had received funding from the Adelaide Film Festival Investment Fund.

In all, the festival presented twelve new Australian movies in which it had invested.

The inaugural Natuzzi International Award for Best Feature Film was won by the Chinese film Still Life, directed and written by Jia Zhang-ke.

Competition

Jury
The following people were selected for the In Competition Jury:

 Noah Cowan, Toronto International Film Festival director (President)
 J. M. Coetzee, South African writer
 James Hewison, Melbourne International Film Festival director  
 Ana Kokkinos, Australian film director
 Clara Law, Hong Kong film director
 Margaret Pomeranz, Australian film critic, producer and television personality
 Mick Harvey, Australian musician, singer-songwriter, composer, arranger and record producer

In Competition
The following films were selected for the In Competition section:

Awards
Don Dunstan Award
The Don Dunstan Award was won by Rolf de Heer.

Festival poster and controversy

The festival's poster depicted a film festival "Eyeball guy" concept. Developed originally by Marketing Manager Nick Zuppar and Graphic Designer Amy Milhinch. A small controversy arose when a similar poster design was employed for the 28th Durban International Film Festival (20 June to 1 July 2007). After discussions, the coincidence was eventually put down to "synchronicity".

References

External links
 Official Website

Adelaide Film Festival
Adelaide Film Festival
2000s in Adelaide
Adelaide Film Festival